Bogoliubov Prize may refer to:

Bogoliubov Prize, an international award offered by the Joint Institute for Nuclear Research for scientists with outstanding contribution to theoretical physics and applied mathematics.
Bogoliubov Prize for young scientists, an award offered by the Joint Institute for Nuclear Research for young researchers in theoretical physics.
Bogoliubov Prize (NASU), an award offered by the National Academy of Sciences of Ukraine for scientists with outstanding contribution to theoretical physics and applied mathematics.